Puycelsi (before 2011: Puycelci) is a commune in the Tarn department in southern France.

It is a member of the Les Plus Beaux Villages de France ("The Most Beautiful Villages of France") association. It had 449 inhabitants in 2017.

Toponym
The name of "Puycelci", or "Puycelsi" comes from the Celtic "Celto Dun", a wooden fortress built on a hill, or oppidum, later transformed into "Podium Celsium" by the Romans.

History
The village itself was founded in a location close to the ancient prehistoric site by Benedictine Monks from the Aurillac Abbey in the 10th century. It stands high above the right bank of the Vère, which flows northwestward through the commune.

The first castle was dismantled after the Treaty of Meaux-Paris, in 1229, but the village remained a stronghold. Though it was besieged several times in the 13th and 14th centuries, it was reportedly never taken by force.

Until the First World War, the village was quite prosperous, with a population of nearly 2,000 in 1830. Almost abandoned in the 1950s, it has since been restored by its inhabitants and is now listed among the “Most Beautiful Villages of France”.

Puycelsi is featured in the 2016 BBC/France Télévisions wildlife film Wild Tales from the Village.

Notable buildings

 the 14th century ramparts, and the Irissou Gate with its double defensive system
 the St-Roch Chapel, built in 1703
 the 15th-century castle
 15th-and-16th-century houses, including the town hall
 the 14th-15th-century St-Corneille Church, with classified well-preserved ancient furniture

Demography

See also
 Communes of the Tarn department
 Tourism in Tarn

References

External links
Festival de Puycelsi

Communes of Tarn (department)
Plus Beaux Villages de France